Personalist party may refer to:
Personalist Labor Revolutionary Party
Business-firm party